Bromwell is a surname. Notable people with the surname include:

 Eric M. Bromwell, Maryland politician
 Henry P. H. Bromwell, Illinois politician, Freemason, and author of the book Restorations of Masonic Geometry and Symbolry.
 Jacob H. Bromwell, Ohio politician
 James E. Bromwell, Iowa politician
 Thomas L. Bromwell, convicted Maryland politician

Fictional characters:
 Roy Bromwell, character in the video game Rival Schools

See also
 Bromwell High, fictional animated British high school